This is a list of people who have served as Lord Lieutenant of East Sussex since the creation of the post and the county on 1 April 1974.

Lord Lieutenants of East Sussex
John Nevill, 5th Marquess of Abergavenny 1 April 1974 – 9 November 1989
Sir Lindsay Sutherland Bryson 9 November 1989 – 4 May 2000
Phyllida Stewart-Roberts 4 May 2000 – 19 August 2008
Peter Field 19 August 2008 - 17 August 2021
Andrew Blackman 18 August 2021 -

References

External links
Lord Lieutenant of East Sussex

Local government in East Sussex
Sussex, East
1974 establishments in England